Tell Me Why is Bobby Vinton's eighth studio album, released in July 1964. The title track is the album's only single. Cover versions include "Somewhere Along the Way", "When I Lost You", "Some of These Days", "Maybe You'll Be There", "If You Love Me (Really Love Me)" and "I Wanna Be Loved".

Track listing

Personnel
Robert Morgan - producer
Stan Applebaum - arranger, conductor

Charts
Album - Billboard (United States)

Singles - Billboard (United States)

References

1964 albums
Bobby Vinton albums
Epic Records albums